Red de Radiodifusión Bíblica is a religious, Spanish-language radio network operated by the Charlotte, North Carolina based Bible Broadcasting Network.

The programming of this network is primarily directed toward people living in Latin-American countries, although some U.S. radio stations in states bordering Mexico also broadcast the network.

External links 
 BBN International website

Christian radio stations in the United States